Ituzaingó Yacyretá Airport is a public use airport serving Ituzaingó, a town on the Paraná River in Corrientes Province, Argentina.

Northwest approach and departure may be over the water.

See also

Transport in Argentina
List of airports in Argentina

References

External links 
OpenStreetMap - Ituzaingó Yacyretá Airport
FallingRain - Ituzaingo Airport

Airports in Argentina
Corrientes Province